The 2020 Austrian motorcycle Grand Prix was the fifth round of the 2020 Grand Prix motorcycle racing season and the fourth round of the 2020 MotoGP World Championship. It was held at the Red Bull Ring in Spielberg on 16 August 2020. Brad Binder was the defending MotoGP race winner who aimed for his second consecutive Grand Prix win, having won his and KTM's first race at the previous round.

Andrea Dovizioso was the defending race winner, having won the race in 2019. The race was won by Ducati rider Andrea Dovizioso with Joan Mir in second for Suzuki, his first podium in MotoGP, while Jack Miller finished third for Pramac Racing.

The race day was notable for an unprecedented series of accidents in the MotoGP and Moto2 category respectively. On lap 4 of the Moto2 race, Enea Bastianini, who was fifth at the moment, suffered a huge highside on the exit of turn 1. Several backmarkers behind Bastianini were able to avoid hitting his stranded bike, which was laying across the circuit on the approach to the back straight into turn 2. However, Hafizh Syahrin, who was running in seventeenth at the moment, came out of the slipstream of Jake Dixon and hit Bastianini's bike at over 200 kph within fractions of a second. Syahrin then was sent airborne as a result of the accident and landed a further fifty metres ahead of the circuit. Edgar Pons and Andi Farid Izdihar were also involved in this accident. Syahrin was taken to the medical center with the suspicion of a leg injury and was therefore ruled out of the Styrian GP for the upcoming weekend at the same venue.

The second crash occurred on lap 9 of the MotoGP race involving Johann Zarco and Franco Morbidelli, who came together on the approach to turn 3. By making contact with each other, Morbidelli and Zarco each fell off their bikes, with Morbidelli's bike sliding across the grass on the outside of the track in full speed, then slightly taking-off before somersaulting multiple times and then flying straight back on track onto the apex of turn 3 and narrowly missing out both Yamaha factory riders Maverick Viñales and Valentino Rossi in the process, who were running in sixth and seventh place respectively. After missing both, the bike itself somersaulted a further multiple times before it came to a rest on the tarmac run-off completely destroyed. Zarco's bike however tangentially hit the safer barrier at high-speed and flew above the circuit also narrowly missing out Viñales and suffered extremely terminal damage such as Morbidelli's wrecked bike.

Both races were immediately red-flagged due to respective track-cleaning actions.

Background

Impact of the COVID-19 pandemic 
 The opening rounds of the 2020 championship was heavily affected by the COVID-19 pandemic. Several Grands Prix were cancelled or postponed after the aborted opening round in Qatar, prompting the Fédération Internationale de Motocyclisme to draft a new calendar. However, the Austrian Grand Prix was not impacted by this change and kept its original date.

MotoGP Championship standings before the race 
After the third round at the Czech Grand Prix, Fabio Quartararo on 59 points, leads the championship by 17 points over Maverick Viñales, with Franco Morbidelli a further 28 points behind. In Teams' Championship, Petronas Yamaha SRT with 90 points, lead the championship from Monster Energy Yamaha, who have 69. KTM Factory Racing sit 22 points behind the factory Yamaha in third, and are only 5 points ahead of fourth-placed Ducati Team, who have 42 points, while Esponsorama Racing sit 5th on 35 points.

MotoGP Entrants 

Stefan Bradl replaced Marc Márquez from the Czech Republic round onwards while he recovered from injuries sustained in his opening round crash.
 Ducati test rider Michele Pirro replaced Francesco Bagnaia in Austria while he recovered from injuries sustained in a crash during practice at the Czech round.

Qualifying

MotoGP

Q1 
Johann Zarco and Valentino Rossi qualified for Q2.

Q2

Race

MotoGP
The race, scheduled to be run for 28 laps, was red-flagged after 8 full laps due to an accident involving Johann Zarco and Franco Morbidelli. The race was later restarted over 20 laps with the starting grid determined by the classification of lap 8.

Moto2
The race, scheduled to be run for 25 laps, was red-flagged after 3 full laps due to an accident involving Enea Bastianini, Hafizh Syahrin, Edgar Pons, and Andi Farid Izdihar. The race was later restarted over 13 laps.

Moto3

 Khairul Idham Pawi withdrew from the event due to effects of a broken finger suffered at the previous round in Czech Republic.

Championship standings after the race
Below are the standings for the top five riders, constructors, and teams after the round.

MotoGP

Riders' Championship standings

Constructors' Championship standings

Teams' Championship standings

Moto2

Riders' Championship standings

Constructors' Championship standings

Teams' Championship standings

Moto3

Riders' Championship standings

Constructors' Championship standings

Teams' Championship standings

Notes

References

External links

Austrian
Motorcycle Grand Prix
Austrian motorcycle Grand Prix
Austrian motorcycle Grand Prix